Chidi Collins Oparaojiaku  is an Anglican bishop in Nigeria: he is the current Bishop of Ohaji/Egbema.

Notes

Living people
Anglican bishops of Ohaji/Egbema
21st-century Anglican bishops in Nigeria
Year of birth missing (living people)